56 Ursae Majoris (56 UMa) is a star in the constellation Ursa Major. Its apparent magnitude is 5.03. It is a single-lined spectroscopic binary with an orbital period of about 45 years. The companion star is likely a heavy neutron star born by a supernova that exploded around 100,000 years ago.

References

Ursa Major (constellation)
G-type giants
Barium stars
Spectroscopic binaries
Ursae Majoris, 56
Durchmusterung objects
098839
055560
4392